is a Japanese economist, retired politician, and political activist last serving as Minister of Internal Affairs and Communications and Minister of State for Privatization of the Postal Services in the cabinet of Prime Minister Junichiro Koizumi. As of July 2007, he is a professor at Keio University and an advisor for other academic institutions and companies.

Academic life 
Takenaka was the second son of a shoe seller in Wakayama City. He attended Hitotsubashi University to study under Ichiro Nakayama and graduated with a BA in Economics in 1973. While at Hitotsubashi, he played the mandolin, and met his wife (a student at Tsuda College) through his mandolin club.

In 1973, Takenaka entered the Development Bank of Japan. He was transferred into its Institute for Capital Investment Studies in 1977.

In 1981, he left the DBJ to study for a year at Harvard University and the University of Pennsylvania, where he researched capital investment in the United States. The product of his research, the 1984 book Development Studies and Capital Expenditure Economics, won the Suntory Liberal Arts Prize.

Takenaka then worked in the Ministry of Finance as a money supply researcher. He initially planned to stay for two years, but ended up working there for five years, from 1982 to 1987.

He later completed his Ph.D. at Osaka University. He taught as an associate professor at Osaka (1987–89) and Harvard (1989–90), and received tenure in the Faculty of Policy Management of Keio University SFC (Shonan Fujisawa Campus).

Political life 

Takenaka was picked by Koizumi to become the Minister of State for Economic and Fiscal Policy in 2001. In this capacity, Takenaka has become one of the most prominent voices in the ongoing debate over the privatization and breakup of Japan Post.

In 2002 he became Minister of State for Financial Services as well. In this capacity he was the author of the Takenaka Plan, which successfully tackled Japan's banking crisis. One of his biggest accomplishments was to change attitudes within the financial industry, including auditors who had previously rubber-stamped bank earnings reports that understated the size of bad loans. A turning point came in May 2003, when auditors refused to approve the earnings statement of Resona Bank (see Resona Holdings), forcing the bank to seek a $17 billion bailout from the Japanese government.

Takenaka won his first election in 2004 and held a proportional representation seat in the House of Councillors.

After Koizumi's Liberal Democratic Party crushing victory in the 2005 General Election, Takenaka assumed his last position as Minister of Internal Affairs and Communications, in charge of Japan Post privatization.

He further attempted to privatize the national public broadcaster NHK but Koizumi did not agree and the attempt was stalled.
On 15 September 2005, he announced his retirement from politics. On 28 September his resignation from the House of Councillors was permitted. On 29 September, he submitted a resignation letter to the Liberal Democratic Party, which was agreed on 11 November. On the same day his return to Keio University was disclosed. Now, he is the Chairman of Pasona facing multiple unethical business conducts over the Tokyo Olympics games.

References

External links 
  Official website
 Profile at Prime Minister's Office
 Japan acts to address banks' bad debt crisis, October 2002 article in The Independent
 Official announcement of Plan for Financial Revival (so-called Takenaka Plan)

1951 births
Living people
Japanese chairpersons of corporations
Harvard University alumni
Hitotsubashi University alumni
Japanese corporate directors
20th-century Japanese economists
21st-century Japanese economists
Academic staff of Keio University
Members of the House of Councillors (Japan)
Ministers of Internal Affairs of Japan
Osaka University alumni
Academic staff of Kansai University
Academic staff of Osaka University
People from Wakayama (city)
University of Pennsylvania alumni
Columbia University people